John Blakeney (12 September 1756 – 23 August 1781) was an Irish Member of Parliament.

The son of Robert Blakeney, he was elected to the Irish House of Commons for the family borough of Athenry in June 1776, sitting until his death at age 24. He also served in the army as a Lieutenant in the 14th Dragoons.

References
 http://thepeerage.com/p27668.htm#i276678
 https://web.archive.org/web/20090601105535/http://www.leighrayment.com/commons/irelandcommons.htm

1756 births
1781 deaths
Politicians from County Galway
Irish MPs 1776–1783
Members of the Parliament of Ireland (pre-1801) for County Galway constituencies